Chennai Worlds 2014 (CW14) is the 34th World Universities Debating Championship, hosted and conducted by Rajalakshmi Engineering College, Chennai, Tamil Nadu, India under the aegis of Rajalakshmi Institutions on 27 December 2013 – 4 January 2014.

The World Universities Debating Championship (WUDC) is the world's largest debating tournament, and one of the largest annual international student events in the world. It is a parliamentary debating event, held using the British Parliamentary Debate format. Each year, the event is hosted by a university selected by the World Universities Debating Council. The tournament is colloquially referred to as "Worlds" and the winners of the open competition acknowledged as the "world champions". The event was ultimate won by a team from Harvard University (Josh Zoffer and Ben Sprung-Keyser), who competed in the Grand Final against teams from the Glasgow University Union, Cambridge University, and the University of Sydney Union. The World Champion 2014 in the category "English as a second language" is Berlin A (Dessislava Kirova and Kai Dittmann) and in the category "English as a foreign language" Bandung A (Vicario Reinaldo and Fauzan Reza Maulana).

Controversy
The event was marked by considerable controversy, including:
 Failures by the university administration to meet budgetary obligations to pay independent adjudicators in non-controlled currencies (resulting in strike threats, ultimately jeopardizing the 7th round of the tournament).
 Difficulties experienced by Pakistani participants upon arrival in the country.
 The decision to hold a motorcycle exhibition during Women's Night, an event traditionally held to support and celebrate female participants, in order to appeal to males 
 Relocation of the tournament hotel from the ITC Grand Chola to several more distant and lower quality venues, without sufficient room to house all the participants.
 Efforts by those hotels to lock participants out of their rooms (as late as 2AM, on multiple occasions, to settle incidental room charges).
 The withholding of passports from participants attempting to catch flights out of the country in an effort to force them to pay funds promised by Rajalakshmi Engineering College.

See also
 Policy debate competitions

References

Worlds 2014 in Chennai. The Hindu.
Sizzling debates mark the ‘Worlds’. The Hindu.
Harvard University Emerges Debating World Champion. Indian Express.
Pakistan at Chennai Worlds. The News International.
Duo wins "Worlds" debate competition. Harvard Gazette.

External links
 Official website
 Achte Minute: Adjudicator Strike at Chennai Worlds
 

Rajalakshmi Institutions
Debating competitions